The 2020–21 Primera División Femenina de Fútbol was the 33rd edition of Spain's highest women's football league, the 20th since the inception of the Superliga Femenina. The league was scheduled to start on 5 September 2020 and to finish on 27 June 2021, however, the start date was delayed to 3 October.

Barcelona were the defending champions after cancellation 2019–20 edition due to COVID-19 pandemic in Spain. They retained their title emphatically, dropping only 3 points all season (a defeat by Atlético Madrid after already being declared champions), and also won the Copa de la Reina and UEFA Women's Champions League competitions.

Teams

Eibar and Santa Teresa promoted from Segunda División Pro. Tacón changed its name to Real Madrid after being absorbed by the namesake club.

Stadia and locations

Personnel and sponsorship

Managerial changes

League table

Standings

Results

Positions by round
The table lists the positions of teams after each week of matches. In order to preserve chronological evolvements, any postponed matches are not included to the round at which they were originally scheduled, but added to the full round they were played immediately afterwards.

Statistics

RFEF official website 

RFEF official website 

RFEF official website 

RFEF official website

References

External links
Official Website 
Primera División (women) at La Liga 

2020-21
Spa
1
women's